Shane Arthur Rufer (born 23 March 1960) is a New Zealand former association football player, who played as a centre forward, midfielder and defender. He represented New Zealand on nineteen occasions between 1979 and 1985, making his debut on 29 June 1979 in a 6–0 win over Fiji.

The son of a Swiss father, Arthur Rufer, and a mother of Māori descent, Anne Hine Rufer (née Campbell), Shane Rufer is the elder brother of Oceania Player of the Century Wynton Rufer. The two brothers joined Norwich City on trial for six months in 1981 and played in the reserves. City's hopes of signing the Kiwi duo were dashed when the Home Office refused to grant them a work permit.

Rufer's son, Alex also plays professional association football, currently with A-League club Wellington Phoenix.

References

External links

YHM Profile 
Ex Canaries Profile 

1960 births
Living people
FC Zürich players
New Zealand association footballers
Servette FC players
New Zealand international footballers
AC Bellinzona players
New Zealand people of Swiss descent
Stop Out players
New Zealand Māori sportspeople
Ngāti Porou people
Expatriate football managers in the Cook Islands
Cook Islands national football team managers
Association football midfielders
New Zealand association football coaches